Sarah (Sally) Wiggin is a prominent television news anchor and personality in Pittsburgh.

Early life and education 

A native of Kalamazoo, Michigan, her family moved to Florence, Alabama when she was 6 years old.  She attended Emory University for a year before transferring to the University of Alabama, where she studied East Asian history and graduated Phi Beta Kappa. She earned a master's degree in Asian Studies from the University of Michigan and studied Japanese at the University of Pittsburgh.

Career 

She first worked for (then ABC affiliate) WBRC-TV (now a Fox affiliate) in Birmingham, Alabama, where she won Alabama Associated Press Award in 1980 for her feature series "Is Your Marriage on the Rocks?" She also worked as WSGN radio in Birmingham, Alabama, where she shared an RTNDA Edward R. Murrow Award, National Headliners Award, and National Sigma Delta Chi Award for her part in an investigative report on insurance fraud in 1977.

In 1980, she joined WTAE-TV in Pittsburgh and became co-anchor of the weekend news in 1981. In November 1986, she was named anchor for the weeknight news. In that position, she was part of a successful team with Don Cannon. In 1987, she won the United Press International Best Special Award for her work on The Budd Dwyer Special about Pennsylvania State Treasurer Budd Dwyer's on-air suicide.

Wiggin became a host for the Pittsburgh Steelers pre-game shows in 1993 and continued until December 2017. She also makes regular guest appearances on WDVE morning comedy show. Wiggin's role with WTAE shifted in 2004 when she left the 11 pm news and joined the noon news. She left the 6 pm news in 2008, but did special reports and in-depth interviews for the station. On June 21, 2013, WTAE announced that Wiggin would host "Chronicle" and would step down as the anchor of the Noon broadcast. In 2015, she was part of a team that received a Peabody Award. On November 30, 2018, she retired from WTAE. Her only marriage, to a minor league baseball player, ended in divorce.

External links
Sally Wiggin bio
Sally Wiggin gives us a glimpse of life at home

References

Living people
University of Alabama alumni
University of Michigan alumni
University of Pittsburgh alumni
People from Kalamazoo, Michigan
American television reporters and correspondents
Pittsburgh television reporters
Year of birth missing (living people)
Journalists from Pennsylvania